Krasner is a surname. Notable people with the surname include:

 Gerald Krasner (born 1949), former Chairman of Leeds United A.F.C.
 Krasner v McMath
 Larry Krasner (born 1961), American lawyer, District Attorney of Philadelphia 
 Lee Krasner (1908–1984), American artist
 Pollock-Krasner House and Studio
 Pollock-Krasner Foundation
 Lisa Krasner, American politician
 Louis Krasner (1903–1995), Russian-American violinist and teacher
 Milton R. Krasner, film cinematographer
 Naum Krasner (1924–1999), Ukrainian/Russian mathematician and economist
 Krasner's lemma, in number theory
 Stephen D. Krasner (born 1942), political scientist and author
 Steven Krasner (born 1953), sports writer and author of children's books

See also
 Michael Krassner (born 1971), American musician and composer
 Paul Krassner (1932–2019),  author, journalist, stand-up comedian
 Krasna (disambiguation)